The 2011 Kyrgyzstan League season was the 20th edition of the Kyrgyzstan League. It started on 17 April 2011 with six teams taking part. The final matchday was held on 22 October 2011.

Clubs

The championship will be consisting of four round-robins, so each team will play in 20 games.
 FC Neftchi Kochkor-Ata
 FC Dordoi Bishkek
 Abdish-Ata Kant
 Alga Bishkek
 Alay Osh
 FC Issyk Kul (Karakol)

League table

Results table
The results of the first two-round were:

The results of the second two-round were:

Top goalscorers
The top scorers are:

References
 Kyrgyzstan League 2011 (Russian)
 Football League Kyrgyzstan (Russian)

External links
 League at soccerway.com

Kyrgyzstan League seasons
1
Kyrgyzstan
Kyrgyzstan